The Jaguares de Petén are a Guatemalan professional basketball club that is based in the Petén Department, Guatemala. The club competes in the LPB (Guatemala).

It has provided the Guatemala national basketball team with several key players.

Notable players
 Ricardo Amaya
 Pablo Gonzalez

External links 
Latinbasket.com Team Page
FIBA Americas Profile
FIBA Archive

Basketball teams established in 1958
Basketball teams in Guatemala
Petén Department